"Carrying Your Love with Me" is a song written by Steve Bogard and Jeff Stevens, and performed by American country music artist George Strait.  It was released in May 1997 as the second single and title track from his album of the same name.  The song reached the top of the Billboard Hot Country Singles & Tracks chart.  The track was also voted by website Country Universe as number 200 of the top 400 greatest songs of the 1990s. "Carrying Your Love with Me" was nominated for Best Male Country Vocal Performance at the 1998 Grammy Awards.

Content
The song is about a man who has to leave home for periods of time, though he carries the love of his significant other with him wherever he is. Memorable lyrics include the opening line, "Baby all I got is this beat up leather bag, and everything I own don't fill up half." Another notable line is in the chorus which includes the title of the song, "I'm carrying your love with me, West Virginia down to Tennessee."

Music video
The music video was directed by Christopher Cain, and premiered on CMT on May 26, 1997 as its "Hot Shot Video of the Week". The video begins in black-and-white, where Strait walks into an empty auditorium, with an old leather bag at his side. The scene switches from black-and-white to color, Strait puts the leather bag down, looks directly into the camera, and began to sing. The video has scenes that relate to the lyrics of the song and keeps with the context of Strait being away from home and missing his significant other. The scenes include Strait walking along a highway, hitching a ride with a truck driver, standing in the rain, and missing his significant other back home as a couple on a motorcycle ride by and it shows the clouds, the waters, and the sun, and it shows Strait walking with a truck, during the instrumental break, he drives the truck into the water, and shows him walking down the road, The video ends with Strait picking up the leather bag from the beginning of the video, and leaving an empty auditorium, as the scene switched back to black-and-white. The singer joined Vevo on May 11, 2009.

Significance
"Carrying Your Love with Me" contributed to the overall success of Strait's album of the same name. It was Strait's 21st release with record company MCA Nashville. At the time the singer had with the label for 15 years. Although many critics argue that the track was nothing new from the country music alum, it was still a success. Many reviewers stated that during a time of pop country and big revenue stars such as Shania Twain and Garth Brooks, Strait along with his album (and song) "Carrying Your Love with Me" kept country music relevant. In April 1998 on All Things Considered, Jacki Lyden and country music DJ Tom Rivers discussed the appeal of country music. Using the track as an example, Rivers stated that country music is relatable because it speaks of common occurrences such as heartache and missing loved ones. The two deejays specifically mention the track "Carrying Your Love with Me" and use it as an ideal example.

In July 2022, the song regained popularity through singer David Morris in his song "Carrying Your Love", a country rap song which contains an altered sample of the chorus. This song went viral on TikTok that month.

Reviews
The overall views for the track are positive. Many reviewers approve of the traditional country sound of the track. George Strait makes it very clear that he is not a songwriter, and many critics praise his ability to choose hit songs such as "Carrying Your Love with Me". Music critic Tony Brown stated that it is "unlikely that anyone in country music has a better ear for songs.". Miriam Longino, writing for the Atlantic Constitution, gave the track and the album as a whole an A minus. Another notable review came from music critic Alexander Wiley. He stated that "Carrying Your Love with Me" was another "crown jewel from the king of country music". Critic Chet Flippo, writing for Billboard, gave a positive review stating that the track and tone of Strait's voice is reminiscent of traditional country music.

Chart positions

Year-end charts

Certifications

References

1996 songs
1997 singles
George Strait songs
Song recordings produced by Tony Brown (record producer)
Songs written by Jeff Stevens (singer)
Songs written by Steve Bogard
MCA Nashville Records singles